Yousef Al Sayegh (Arabic: يوسف الصائغ) (1933-2005) was an Iraqi poet, novelist, and playwright.

Career 
Yousef was born in Mosul into a Christian family. In 1955, He graduated from the Department of Arabic Language at Dar Al-Mu’alimeen Al- ‘aliya (The Higher Teachers' House) with a master’s degree. He worked as a teacher for around 25 years. Then, he was appointed as Director-General of the Film and Theatre Department. He also worked in journalism for a long time. After the 1963 revolution, the Ba'ath Party imprisoned him for his political activities. He remained in prison until the early seventies. Then, he worked as a journalist. He wrote several poetry collections and a play. He was a member of The Writers’ Union, Artists Association, the Journalists Syndicate, the Higher Committee of Al-Mirbad Festival, and the Babylon Festival. He immigrated from Iraq to Syria and converted to Islam. He died in Damascus on December 12, 2005.

Poetry Works 

 Qasaid Gair Saliha LilNashr (Poems Not Valid for Publication) (1957).
 I’tirafat Malik Bin Al-Rayb (Malik Bin Al-Rayb's Confessions) (1978).
 Saiyidat Al-Tuffahat Al-Arba’ (Four Apples Lady) (1976).
 I’tirafat (Confessions) (1978).
 Al-Mu’allim (The Teacher) (1985).
 Qasa’id Yosof Al-Sayegh (Yosof Al-Sayegh's Poems) (1993).
 His master's dissertation on free verse poetry in Iraq.

Novels 

 Al-Lu’ba (The Game) (1972).
 Al-Masafa (The Distance) (1974).

Plays 

 Al-Bab (The Door) (1986).
 Al-Awdah (The Return) (1987).
 Dizaymona (1989).

Resources 

Iraqi writers
20th-century Iraqi poets
1933 births
Iraqi journalists
2005 deaths